Historically the rivalry between KF Tirana and Partizani Tirana football clubs, the two biggest in Tirana the capital of Albania, has been followed by many football fans and much spectacle either on the pitch, or on stands between Tirona Fanatics and Guerrils. Matches between these two teams have a long history and have almost always made the first page news in the country. Between years 2008-13, following Partizani's relegation, and also during 2017-18 season with Tirana's relegation to a lower division, the derby faded away for a while until its return during the 2018–19 season. 

KF Partizani have a historical advantage of 22 wins in the League. However, Tirana has a superior record overall in the last 30 seasons and lead in the overall cup statistics with two more ties won.

Supporters of both teams are mainly local people of the city, however traditionally KF Tirana is considered a middle and upper class club supported by the downtown, with right-wing political tendencies, whereas Partizani is traditionally associated with the working class support from the suburbs, with left-wing political tendencies. Both teams have a great deal of supporters from other cities of Albania, as well as worldwide.

Win–loss totals

Albanian Superior League

Albanian Cup

League & Cup total

All matches

Kategoria Superiore 

1In the 19th week match 17 Nëntori - Partizani played on the pitch ended 2:1. Teams were both awarded 0-3 loss on that match, a decision of AFA.
2The 33rd week match was originally scheduled for the 2 May 2020, but was the postponed to 10 July as the championship of the 2019-20 season was then suspended, due to a pandemic of COVID-19 in Albania.

League placements 
The league placement table shows the results of KF Tirana and Partizani Tirana, when they played in Kategoria Superiore.

• Total: Partizani 39 times higher, KF Tirana 34 times higher.

Top goalscorers

See also
 Oldest Albanian derby
 Tirana derbies
 Dinamo Tirana–KF Tirana rivalry

References

External links
KF Tirana - Partizani Tirana, A Derby of History (Youtube) 
Results of the derby, starting of 1997

Football derbies in Albania
Rivalry with Partizani
Rivalry with Tirana